Joseph Paul Smaza (July 7, 1923 – May 30, 1979) was an American professional baseball outfielder who briefly played for the Chicago White Sox in .

Smaza attended Western Michigan University and served in the United States Navy during World War II. His pro career began after the war, and lasted into 1950.

He was recalled by the White Sox in September 1946 after playing for the season with the Double-A Shreveport Sports. In his debut game September 18, he collected his lone MLB hit, a single of Tiny Bonham of the New York Yankees at Comiskey Park. He also scored the first of his two big-league runs in a 9–7 Chicago victory, and handled no chances in right field over the full nine innings. Three days later, he pinch ran for veteran Hal Trosky and scored his second MLB run in an 11–10 win over the St. Louis Browns at Sportsman's Park. He batted .200 (one-for-five) and scored two runs in his two games in the majors, without a run batted in.

References

External links

1923 births
1979 deaths
Baseball players from Detroit
Chicago White Sox players
Dallas Eagles players
Dallas Rebels players
Major League Baseball outfielders
Memphis Chickasaws players
Sherman–Denison Twins players
Shreveport Sports players
Tulsa Oilers (baseball) players
United States Navy personnel of World War II
Williamsport Grays players
Williamsport Tigers players